New Germany Rural High School is a high school in Lunenburg County, Nova Scotia, Canada. It is administered by the South Shore Regional Centre for Education.

External links
NGRHS New Germany Rural High School

High schools in Nova Scotia
Schools in Lunenburg County, Nova Scotia